Jens Haugland (16 April 1910 – 2 May 1991) was a Norwegian jurist and politician for the Labour Party.

Haugland was born at Bjelland in Vest-Agder, Norway.  He studied law at the University of Oslo and graduated as cand.jur. in 1936. He worked as a jurist in Stavanger and Kristiansand and was district stipendiary magistrate (sorenskriver) of Setesdal.  He was a member of the executive committee of Kristiansand city council from 1945 to 1954.

He was elected to the Norwegian Parliament from Vest-Agder in 1954, and was re-elected on four occasions. From November 1955 to August 1963, during the third cabinet Gerhardsen, Haugland was Norwegian Minister of Justice and the Police. During the fourth cabinet Gerhardsen from September 1963 to 1965, he was Norwegian Minister of Local Government and Labour. During this period his seat in parliament was taken by Trygve Hanssen, Salve Andreas Salvesen and Olav Tonning Munkejord.

Later he was a Supreme Court judge based out of Bjelland from 1980 to 1991. He was chairman of the Norwegian Committee on Greece from 1968 to 1970, and was a board member of Noregs Mållag from 1975 to 1977. He was a columnist in Sørlandet and Fædrelandsvennen, and published a number of books.

References

External links

1910 births
1991 deaths
Politicians from Kristiansand
University of Oslo alumni
Norwegian jurists
Norwegian diarists
Norwegian columnists
Vest-Agder politicians
Government ministers of Norway
Ministers of Local Government and Modernisation of Norway
Members of the Storting
Labour Party (Norway) politicians
20th-century Norwegian writers
20th-century Norwegian politicians
Ministers of Justice of Norway
20th-century diarists